The British National Team Pursuit Championships are held annually as part of the British National Track Championships organized by British Cycling. Prior to 1996, there were two separate team pursuit championship events for amateur and professional riders. A women's championship was later added, competing over a shorter 3 km distance with three riders, until 2013 when this was increased to 4 km with 4 riders as in the men's event.

Venues and dates
1937-1950 Herne Hill Velodrome
1967, 1971 Quibell Park Stadium, Scunthorpe
1960-1969 Aldersley Stadium, Wolverhampton
1973-1994 (Leicester Velodrome)
1995–present (Manchester Velodrome)
2016 (not held)

Men's Senior

Women's Senior

See also
British National Track Championships

References

Sources
Results 2000
Results 2001
Results 2002
Team pursuit results 2002–2005
Senior & Disability results 2006
Results 2014

Cycle racing in the United Kingdom
National track cycling championships
National championships in the United Kingdom
Annual sporting events in the United Kingdom